Ngā Manu Nature Reserve is a nature and wildlife reserve in Waikanae, New Zealand, on the Kapiti Coast of the North Island.  In addition to offering a sanctuary for native birds and other animals, the  reserve preserves the largest remnant of coastal lowland swamp forest on the Kapiti Coast.

Ngā Manu contains aviaries housing native birds such as kākā, kākāriki, scaup, whio and kea, enclosures with tuatara, and a nocturnal house with kiwi and morepork.

Bird life in the reserve comprises over 50 different bird species, the most visible being common local birds such as kererū, tūī, black swan, paradise duck and pūkeko.  The reserve is not surrounded by a pest-exclusion fence, and as a result the native bush area of the reserve does not host any critically endangered animals, however, Ngā Manu is regularly involved in wider conservation efforts and breeding programmes.

History
Ngā Manu has been managed by the charitable Ngā Manu Trust since 1974 and opened to the public in 1981.

The site was chosen as it had a large remnant of coastal lowland swamp forest and was purchased by founding trustees Peter McKenzie, Prof. John Salmon and David Mudge with part of an inheritance from the late Sir John McKenzie.  The well-known geologist and naturalist Charles Fleming later joined the project and extensive planting and additional landscaping was completed in the late 1970s.

Today, Ngā Manu also serves as an important "stepping stone" for birds travelling between the native forests of Kapiti Island and the Tararua Range.  Visitor numbers have been helped by easier access and signposting on the Kapiti Expressway built in 2017.

Visitor facilities
Closer to the visitor centre, the reserve offers lawn areas and an arboretum of native trees.  An education centre building was added in the 1990s, which is a popular destination for school trips and also available for hire as a venue.  The reserve also offers small tours and individual experiences.

A wheelchair-friendly loop track circles through the native bush home to some 700 native plant species, taking in some small lawn clearings and skirting the 3 small lakes and ponds in the reserve. The largest lake contains several small bush-covered islands connected with small wooden bridges, and there is a side track leading to a lookout tower overlooking the native bush.

References

External links

Nature reserves in New Zealand
Tourist attractions in the Wellington Region
Wetlands of the Wellington Region